Phil Moore (born August 24, 1961) is an American television host, writer, producer, and comedian best known as the host of the Nickelodeon game show Nick Arcade.

Early life
Moore was born and raised in Baltimore, Maryland. Before breaking into the entertainment business in 1986, Moore worked as a computer technician in Orlando, Florida. Eventually, he quit to become a stand-up comedian, doing gigs around the Orlando area.

Career
Moore's first job in television was off-screen as the audience warm-up entertainer for the MTV game show Remote Control. He also worked on Mickey Mouse Club and Let's Make a Deal in a similar capacity. In 1992, Moore debuted as the host of Nick Arcade. Moore hosted or appeared on many other Nickelodeon shows, including hosting the short-lived hidden camera show You're On!, regular appearances as a panelist on Figure It Out, and a guest spot on the first episode of All That.

In 1997 Moore tried his hand at acting in the movie Rosewood, playing Aaron Carrier in the Warner Brothers film. Phil was also a host of Aqua Kids in 2001. He continues hosting and doing guest spots on TV and web shows and now focuses much of his time on making public appearances, as well as producing and writing for a variety of shows including E! Entertainment, BET, Style Network, G4 and HGTV.

Personal life
Moore currently resides in Los Angeles. Moore is part of a TV theme song cover band called, "The Remotes" along with other television personnel and members of the industry.

Filmography

References

External links

1961 births
African-American male actors
American game show hosts
American male television actors
Living people
Male actors from Orlando, Florida
African-American game show hosts
21st-century African-American people
20th-century African-American people